The 1994 SEC Championship Game was won by the Florida Gators 24–23 over the Alabama Crimson Tide.

After two years at Legion Field, the 1994 game was the first to be played in the Georgia Dome in Atlanta, Georgia (which had hosted the game until 2016). The game was played on December 3, 1994, and was televised to a national audience on ABC.

See also
 Alabama–Florida football rivalry

References

External links
Recap of the game from SECsports.com

Championship Game
SEC Championship Game
Alabama Crimson Tide football games
Florida Gators football games
December 1994 sports events in the United States
1994 in sports in Georgia (U.S. state)
1994 in Atlanta